Gao Wenhe (Chinese: 高 文和, born April 8, 1961) is a retired Chinese light-flyweight freestyle wrestler. He won a silver medal at the 1986 Asian Games and placed fourth at the 1984 Summer Olympics.

References

External links
 

1961 births
Living people
Olympic wrestlers of China
Wrestlers at the 1984 Summer Olympics
Chinese male sport wrestlers
Asian Games medalists in wrestling
Wrestlers at the 1986 Asian Games
Asian Games silver medalists for China
Medalists at the 1986 Asian Games
20th-century Chinese people